The First Korean Congress was convened by Philip Jaisohn in Philadelphia from April 12 to 14, 1919 in the Little Theater at 17th and Delancey Streets.

He convened the Congress as a reaction to the March 1st Movement, one of the earliest public displays of Korean resistance during the rule of Korea by Japan from 1910 into 1919. It was inspired by the "Fourteen Points" outlining the right of national "self-determination", which was proclaimed by President Woodrow Wilson at the Paris Peace Conference in January 1919.

Approximately 2,000,000 Koreans had participated in the more than 1,500 demonstrations. Several thousand were massacred by the Japanese police force and army.

The aim was to gain United States support at the Paris Peace Conference in favor of the independence of Korea from Japan.

The result was not attained because Wilson was not interested in challenging global power relations. Since Japan was one of the victors and Korea was its colony, a discussion of the status of Korea was not undertaken.

Attendance to the conference

There were Koreans from New York, Ohio, Illinois, Michigan, Missouri, Wyoming, Nebraska, Iowa, Colorado, California, Pennsylvania and one from London.

There was Dr. Syngman Rhee, who was chosen as one of the Korean representatives to the Paris Peace Conference, 1919 by the Korean National Association, but failed to obtain permission to travel to Paris.

The conference was presided by Philip Jaisohn and opened by a prayer and a speech of Rev. Floyd W. Tomkins, rector of the Church of the Holy Trinity, Philadelphia in Rittenhouse Square and president of the Philadelphia Chapter of League of Friends of Korea, which had 25.000 members in United States and Hawaii.

The three days of conference

In the morning of first day there were the speeches of 
 President Jaisohn
 Miss Nodie Dora Kim, student in Oberlin College, Ohio, post-war minister in Korea 
 Prof. Herbert A. Miller, professor of sociology in Oberlin College, Ohio
 Prof. Alfred J. G. Schadt

In the afternoon of the first day a message was approved for the Provisional Government of the Republic of Korea to “declare that we pledge the moral, material and physical support to the cause of our country’s freedom”. 

An "Appeal to America" was also approved asking the Government of United States to “exert its good offices to save the lives of our freedom-loving brethren in Korea and to protect the American missionaries and their families who are in danger of losing their lives and property on account of their love for our people and their faith in Christ. We further ask you, the great American public, to give us your moral and material help so that our brethren in Korea will know that your sympathy is with them and that you are truly the champions of liberty and international justice.”

The congress adopted a resolution on the “Aims and Aspirations of the Koreans” which proposed a government modeled after that of America, freedom of religion, free commerce with all nations of the world, education of the people, modern sanitary improvements, free speech and press, liberty of action on all matters provided thy do not interfere with the rights of other people or conflict with the laws and interests of the nations.

In the morning of the second day the Catholic Rev. Father James J. Dean, president of Villanova College, offered a prayer and an address. 

A committee prepared a "Message to the Thinking People of Japan" asking to give freedom to Korea. "You will find that Korea will develop into a peaceful, democratic and industrial nation, which will be absolutely neutral in her foreign policies, will be a buffer between your country, China and Russia. The interest of your country requires a friendly buffer state in this region instead of a territory inhabited by sullen, resentful people in whose hearts hatred for you and your government will always exist as long as you try to govern them by force, cruelty and injustice."

In the morning of the third day Rabbi Henry Berkowitz gave a prayer and a speech on behalf of the Jewish Community of Philadelphia. 
He was followed by Reverend Croswell McBee, Rector of St. John's Church, Lansdowne, Pa.

Rev. Tomkins read a communication from the Federation of Churches signed by Dr. MacFarland "proclaiming that the Federation of Churches and the ministers of that body in the United States will stand up in an appeal to the world to make every country independent and free, and that includes Korea."

An appointed Committee prepared a petition to be sent to Washington and to the Peace Conference in Paris.
"We, the representatives of all Koreans residing outside of Korea, in Congress assembled in Philadelphia, Pa., April 14–16, 1919, have the honor to request you to recognize the Provisional Government of the Korean Republic, organized March 1, 1919, representing the will of the entire Korean race of more than 20,000,000 people. This Provisional Government is republican in form, and its guiding spirit is that of true democracy. Men of liberal education and mostly of high Christian character constitute this government.
Our sole aim is to regain the inalienable right of self-determination for our race, so that we may be able to develop as a free people under the guiding principle of Christian democracy.
We beg respectfully to point out that Korea was an independent kingdom until the year of 1905, and that in 1882 the United States was a party to the covenant guaranteeing the integrity and independence of Korea.
We submit this request to you recognizing your splendid championship of international justice, and also to you as the chief executive of the great Republic which has always stood for democracy and the rights of small nations. May we have the joy and happiness of receiving your favorable consideration of our petition?" 

Dr. Clarence E. Macartney, one of the leading ministers of the Christian Church in the City of Philadelphia, gave a speech in support of the Korean cause.
At the end Rev. C. H. Min offered a prayer in Korean.

After the Conference there was a parade across Philadelphia from the Theater to Independence Hall, where the Independence of America was declared and signed, each man and woman carrying a Korean and American flag.  Dr. Syngman Rhee read in the Hall the Korean Declaration of Independence by the Provisional Government of the Republic of Korea on March 1, 1919. After the reading of the Korean Declaration of Independence, the delegates formed in line and as each man passed the Liberty Bell he touched it with his right hand.

A centennial celebration of the congress has been held at the Little Theater in Philadelphia on April 12–14, 2019. The second day has been held in the Church of the Holy Trinity, Philadelphia in Rittenhouse Square. The Council of the City of Philadelphia has recognized the centennial celebration.

External links
 Website of the commemoration of the First Korean Congress in Philadelphia
 First Korean Congress held in the Little Theatre, Philadelphia 1919

Gallery of images

References

 1910s in Philadelphia
Korean independence movement
Conflicts in 1919